Cláudio Ricci (born July 2, 1971 in Passo Fundo) is a Brazilian racing driver. Ricci participate in some races of Stock Car Brasil, the major South American motorsports series and FIA GT3 European Championship. He won the Pick-Up Racing in 2006 and GT3 Brasil Championship in 2009.

Racing record

Stock Car Brasil results

FIA GT Series results

External links
 
 

1971 births
Living people
Brazilian racing drivers
Stock Car Brasil drivers
Brazilian people of Italian descent